A list of islets of Menorca:

 
Islets, Menorca